David John Seyfried-Herbert, 19th Baron Herbert (born 3 March 1952) is a British peer.

Biography 

He was born David John Seyfried, the son of Captain John Seyfried, Royal Horse Guards, and Lady Cathleen Eliot, daughter of the 6th Earl of St Germans. Lord St Germans's wife was Lady Blanche Somerset, daughter of the 9th Duke of Beaufort, descendant of William Herbert from whom the Barony of Herbert originated.

He was educated at Harrow School.  He married, in 1975, Jane Bishop, daughter of Dr Ian Bishop. They have one son, Oliver Richard Seyfried Herbert, born 17 June 1976, and one daughter, Charlotte Sophia Caroline Seyfried Herbert, born 27 October 1977, educated at Wycombe Abbey School and Oriel College, Oxford.  In 2007 she married Julian Collett and they have three sons.

Oliver was educated at Harrow School and St Bartholomew's Hospital. In 2003 he married Sarah (Sally) Victoria Fergusson, daughter of Ian Fergusson FRCS, and they have one son: Oscar James Seyfried Herbert, born 27 November 2004 and two daughters, Coco Florence Seyfried Herbert, born 23 July 2007 and Phoebe Sophia Seyfried Herbert, born 12 June 2008.

In 2002 the Queen terminated the abeyance of the Barony of Herbert in his favour. He is also a co-heir, with one moiety, to the Barony of Botetourt.

Notes

External links
Pedigree of David Seyfried-Herbert, 19th Baron Herbert

|-

People educated at Harrow School
19
Living people
1952 births